Henry Timmer is a retired professional goalkeeper from the Netherlands.

Career 
Timmer was born in the Dutch town of Hoevelaken in 1981. Timmer began his professional career in 2002 with NEC Nijmegen and retired with NSC Nijkerk after the 2014 season. Prior to this, Timmer spent his youth career with teams DDOV, FC Utrecht, and Vitesse Arnhem. From 2006 to 2008, Timmer played for VVOG. Timmer played for Sparta Nijkerk in the 2009–10 KNVB Cup, appearing in the first and second rounds with a defeat of VV Schaesberg in Round 1 and a draw against FC Zwolle in Round 2.

In a 2003 interview, Timmer stated that there has been confusion between himself and another Dutch goalkeeper with the same last name, Henk Timmer. Henry Timmer explained that many of his teammates call him "Henk" as a nickname and that when Henk Timmer was involved in a car accident, Henry Timmer was asked on multiple occasions whether it was him who had been in the accident.

Personal life 
Following his retirement from professional football, Timmer became a coach for SC Hoevelaken. In 2019, Timmer modeled for Roots Fashion in Amersfoort.

Notes

References

External links 
Professional webpage

1981 births
Living people
Dutch footballers
Netherlands youth international footballers
Association football goalkeepers
NEC Nijmegen players
Eerste Divisie players
Footballers from Gelderland
People from Nijkerk